Peter Hans is the current president of the University of North Carolina system. He previously served as the ninth president of the North Carolina Community College System, beginning in 2018.

Education and early life
Hans grew up in Southport and Hendersonville, North Carolina. He earned a Bachelor of Arts degree in political science from UNC-Chapel Hill and a Master of Liberal Arts in Extension Studies from Harvard University.

Career
Hans worked as an advisor to U.S. Senators Lauch Faircloth, Richard Burr and Elizabeth Dole, and later as a lobbyist and public relations consultant. He served a six-year term on the State Board of Community Colleges, where he was vice chair. He later served three terms on the University of North Carolina Board of Governors, including two years as chair. From 2016 to 2018, he advised former UNC System President Margaret Spellings on issues related to technology, health care, strategic planning and K-12 education.

References

Living people
North Carolina Community College System
Year of birth missing (living people)
Harvard Extension School alumni
Presidents of the University of North Carolina System
University of North Carolina at Chapel Hill alumni